James Francis Prestel (born June 28, 1937) is a former professional football player, a defensive lineman in the National Football League (NFL) in the 1960s.

Prestel was with the expansion Minnesota Vikings for their first five seasons, and then one season each with the New York Giants and Washington Redskins.   prior to the

High school and college
Born and raised in Indianapolis, Indiana, Prestel graduated from its Sacred Heart High School (now Roncalli) in 1955. He ventured west to play college football for head coach Skip Stahley at the University of Idaho in Moscow, where he started for the Vandals in the Pacific Coast Conference (PCC) alongside future notable pros Jerry Kramer, Wayne Walker, and Jim Norton. Prestel was a two-sport star athlete for the Vandals, where he also lettered in basketball as a  center for head coach Harlan Hodges, and made honorable mention in the PCC for the 1958–59 season.

Selected by the Browns in the sixth round of the 1959 NFL Draft (70th overall), Prestel chose to remain in college; he had missed most of the 1957 season to return to Indianapolis, where his mother was  He was granted another year of eligibility and played the 1959 season at Idaho as a fifth-year senior, and was elected captain by his 

Prestel broke his left foot in practice prior to the Battle of the Palouse game with Washington State in October 1959, but played the first half of the game anyway. He missed the remainder of the football season (4 games), the East-West Shrine Game, and the entire basketball season, but was All-Coast honorable mention in football. Prestel played in the College All-Star Game at Soldier Field in August 1960, against the defending NFL champion

Retirement
As of 2023, Pretsel resides in Parker, Colorado.

References

External links
University of Idaho Athletics Hall of Fame – Jim Prestel

Original Viking – Jim Prestel
 

1937 births
Living people
American football defensive linemen
Cleveland Browns players
Minnesota Vikings players
New York Giants players
Washington Redskins players
Idaho Vandals football players
Idaho Vandals men's basketball players
Players of American football from Indianapolis
American men's basketball players
Centers (basketball)